William Ross Smyth  (January 3, 1857 – September 7, 1932) was an Ontario merchant and political figure. He represented Algoma in the Legislative Assembly of Ontario from 1902 to 1908 and Algoma East in the House of Commons of Canada from 1908 to 1917 as a Conservative member.

He was born in Thomroam Tarves, Aberdeenshire, Scotland, the son of Francis Smyth. In 1879, he married Nancy Burden. Smyth was a lumber merchant. He was also president of the Nancy Helen Mine. He led the 238th Battalion of the Canadian Expeditionary Force during World War I. He was appointed a Commander of the Order of the British Empire in the 1919 New Year Honours.

References 

Canadian Parliamentary Guide, 1910, EJ Chambers

External links 
Member's parliamentary history for the Legislative Assembly of Ontario
 

1857 births
1932 deaths
Progressive Conservative Party of Ontario MPPs
Members of the House of Commons of Canada from Ontario
Conservative Party of Canada (1867–1942) MPs
Canadian Commanders of the Order of the British Empire
People from Aberdeenshire
Scottish emigrants to Canada